Shawn Blore (born 1 August 2000) is a professional rugby league footballer who plays as a  forward for the Wests Tigers in the National Rugby League (NRL).

He made his debut in the NRL in 2020.

Background
Blore played his junior rugby league for Brothers Penrith in the Penrith District Junior Rugby League before progressing onto the Penrith Panthers juniors. In 2020 he signed with the Wests Tigers on a two-year deal.

Career

2020
Blore made his first grade debut in round 11 of the 2020 NRL season for Wests Tigers against the Parramatta Eels at Bankwest Stadium where Wests lost the match 26–16.
He was said to have "stood his ground in a fiery head-to-head and came away with a points decision" against Parramatta's Nathan Brown. After the match, coach Michael Maguire said, "I don't think he's played a full game of footy for about 14 months now, to see him play the way he did it was welcome to first grade that's for sure. He played a lot of time too, I didn't expect him to play that much time but he hung strong and showed he can play at this level." He made 5 appearances from the bench during the season, all losses.

2021
Blore played a total of twelve games for the Wests Tigers in the 2021 NRL season as the club finished 13th and missed the finals.

2022
On 4 February, it was announced that Blore would miss the entire 2022 NRL season after suffering an ACL injury during training at Concord Oval.

References

External links
Wests Tigers profile

2000 births
Living people
Australian rugby league players
Australian people of New Zealand descent
Australian sportspeople of Samoan descent
Wests Tigers players
Rugby league second-rows
Western Suburbs Magpies NSW Cup players
Rugby league players from Sydney